Griffin Reinhart (born January 24, 1994) is a Canadian former professional ice hockey defenceman who last played for the Belfast Giants of the Elite Ice Hockey League (EIHL). 

He was drafted fourth overall by the New York Islanders in the 2012 NHL Entry Draft. During his tenure in the National Hockey League (NHL), Reinhart played for the Islanders and the Edmonton Oilers.

Playing career

Major junior
After recording 36 points in the regular season, a career high, Reinhart won the 2012 WHL Playoffs with the Oil Kings. Reinhart was selected fourth overall by the New York Islanders, in the 2012 NHL Entry Draft and signed a three-year entry level contract with them on August 2, 2012.
On September 18, 2012, Reinhart was named captain of the Oil Kings.

Although the Oil Kings qualified for the 2013 WHL Playoffs, Reinhart injured his foot and was unable to play in the WHL finals, won by the Portland Winterhawks.

In his last year in the WHL, Reinhart helped lead the Oil Kings to their second WHL Championship within three years on May 12, 2014. He was named to the WHL (East) Second All-Star Team and WHL Playoff MVP for his efforts. The Oil Kings also named Reinhart and teammate Cody Corbett co-winners of the team’s Top Defenceman award. On May 25, the Oil Kings won the Memorial Cup over Guelph Storm.

Professional
Although Reinhart spent the majority of the 2014–15 season with the Islanders AHL affiliate, the Bridgeport Sound Tigers, he made his NHL debut on October 10, 2014, against the Carolina Hurricanes.

On June 26, 2015, Reinhart was traded by the Islanders to the Edmonton Oilers in exchange for the Oilers' 2015 first-round pick (16th overall, Mathew Barzal) and second-round pick (33rd overall, Mitchell Stephens) in the 2015 NHL Entry Draft.

Having been left exposed by the Oilers at the 2017 NHL Expansion Draft, Reinhart was selected by the Vegas Golden Knights on June 21, 2017. On October 30, Reinhart was sent to the Golden Knights' AHL affiliate, the Chicago Wolves.

After leaving the NHL as a free agent, Reinhart spent his first season abroad, playing with Chinese based HC Kunlun Red Star of the Kontinental Hockey League during the COVID-19 pandemic affected 2019–20 season. He made 33 appearances for Kunlun, registering just 3 assists from the blueline.

As a free agent into the 2020–21 season, Reinhart belatedly joined German club, Iserlohn Roosters of the DEL, for the remainder of the campaign on February 12, 2021.

In August 2021, Reinhart agreed terms with UK EIHL side Belfast Giants ahead of the 2021-22 season.

Personal life
Griffin is the son of Paul Reinhart, an All-Star NHL defenseman for Atlanta/Calgary and Vancouver in the 1980s. Griffin's older brother, Max, was drafted by the Calgary Flames in 2010 and his younger brother Sam was drafted second overall in 2014 by the Buffalo Sabres.

Career statistics

Regular season and playoffs

International

Awards and honours

References

External links
 

1994 births
Living people
Bakersfield Condors players
Belfast Giants players
Bridgeport Sound Tigers players
Canadian ice hockey defencemen
Chicago Wolves players
Edmonton Oil Kings players
Edmonton Oilers players
Ice hockey people from British Columbia
Iserlohn Roosters players
HC Kunlun Red Star players
National Hockey League first-round draft picks
New York Islanders draft picks
New York Islanders players
People from West Vancouver
Canadian expatriate ice hockey players in Germany
Canadian expatriate ice hockey players in the United States
Canadian expatriate ice hockey players in China
Canadian expatriate ice hockey players in Northern Ireland